The Girls' Day Out Show is an event primarily for women who enjoy fashion, lifestyle and beauty. It is a similar concept to The Clothes Show Live. It was founded in 2009 and has been a growing convention every year, attracting over 16,000 visitors on average.

History 

It is run by PSP. Events and the first one held at the SEC Centre in 2009.

Established top model scouts have frequently visited the show and used it as a talent-selection pool. Colours Agency and Select Model Management who represent stars such as Agyness Deyn, The Saturdays, Mischa Barton and Amanda Hendrick attended.

2009 

Held at the SEC Centre, Glasgow.

It was sponsored by tanning specialist Fake Bake, and in association with Boots and No1 Magazine.

2010 

Held at the SEC Centre, Glasgow. The Saturday ticket was a sell out.

2011 

In 2011, it was held in Manchester for the first time. It was at The Central also known as Manchester Central Convention Complex (but more commonly, formerly, known as the G-Mex).

It caused some controversy as a cosmetic surgeon attended the show, providing free ten-minute consultations.

Peter Andre made an appearance and is considered a notable event at Manchester Central Convention Complex.

2012 

It was held at the SEC Centre in Glasgow from 30 November to 2 December.

The Girls' Day Out Show has been said to play a part in boosting the local economy of where it takes place.

Celebrities like 'Two Shoes' who were runners up on The X Factor also made an appearance.

The stands there such as; FakeBake, Bella's Blush, Fashion Rocks My Soul, The London Perfume Company, Actiderm and Lauren's Way, brought in the highest number of customers to date.

Media coverage 

The Girls' Day Out Show has featured in No 1 Magazine and Event Magazine when it announced plans to expand further to Edinburgh, Birmingham, Manchester and Glasgow.

It was a deal on Happli and has been the local press of the moment like The Manchester Evening News.

References

External links 

Recurring events established in 2009
Tourist attractions in Glasgow